The National Movement was a far-right political party in Luxembourg.

The National Movement rose to prominence as a result of the legislative and European elections in 1989, when under the leadership of Pierre Peters.  In the European elections, it recorded 2.9% of the vote nationwide.

The last elections that it contested were the legislative and European elections on 12 June 1994. They came at the height of a wave of indiscriminate racist attacks, neo-Nazi demonstrations in Luxembourg, and it was suggested that the National Movement may capitalise by winning a seat in the Chamber of Deputies. However, in domestic and European elections, its share of the vote fell, the party failed to win a seat in either election, and it was promptly disbanded.

Electoral results

Chamber of Deputies

European Parliament 

Defunct political parties in Luxembourg
Neo-Nazi political parties in Europe
Far-right political parties
Nationalist parties in Luxembourg
Luxembourgian nationalism